Major esports events and tournaments in 2011

 
Esports by year